Eikhoi Pabunggi (English: Of Our Father) is a 2016 multi-starrer comedy Indian Meitei language film directed by Hemanta Khuman and written by Binoranjan Oinam. The film features Denny Likmabam, Leishangthem Tonthoi, Bala Hijam, Eshita Yengkhom, Biju Ningombam, Ithoi Oinam, Suraj Sharma Laimayum, Pilot and Mukabala (Loya) in the lead roles. The film was released on 17 September 2016 at Bhagyachandra Open Air Theatre (BOAT), Imphal.

It was also released at Delhi University Conference Centre, University of Delhi, New Delhi, on 1 October 2016.

Synopsis
Sanatombi passed away too early leaving her three sons. Thabal raises them as a single parent. When they grow up, they fall for their teacher Engellei. She turns out to be their father's girlfriend.

Cast
 Bala Hijam as Huidrom Engellei Chanu
 Denny Likmabam as Thabal, Sanatombi's husband
 Leishangthem Tonthoi as Sanatombi
 Eshita Yengkhom
 Biju Ningombam
 Ithoi Oinam
 Suraj Sharma Laimayum as Pikpik, Sanatombi's son 
 Mukabala (Loya) as Sanatombi's son
 Pilot (Prince) as Tondang, Sanatombi's son
 Idhou as Thanil, Thabal's father
 R.K. Sorojini as Tharik, Thabal's mother
 Surjit Saikhom as Okram Ibotombi Singh
 Rina as Chombi, Ibotombi's wife
 Ratan Lai

Production
This film is the second production of Nilahari Films after critically acclaimed Eidee Kadaida (Where Am I). It is presented by Father Mother.

Soundtrack
Rahul Blue and Boi Malangba composed the soundtrack for the film and Abung Wai and Binoranjan Oinam wrote the lyrics. The songs are titled Choirabi (Laklo Eigi Pamuba Nangbu), Mikup Khuding Khalli Eina and Khubak Khunam. Upon the official release of the video song Choirabi (Laklo Eigi Pamuba Nangbu) in digital platforms on 2 December 2015, many used to comment that the song picturisation was a copy from Gerua song for the Bollywood movie Dilwale, but the director of the film Hemanta Khuman denied saying that the song, and consequently the film starting shooting prior to the Bollywood movie.

References

External links
 

2016 films
2010s Meitei-language films